Lavandevil Rural District is a rural district (dehestan) in Lavandevil District, Astara County, Gilan Province, Iran. At the 2006 census, its population was 6,796, in 1,581 families. The rural district has 7 villages.

References 

Rural Districts of Gilan Province
Astara County